Shane Paul Gibson (February 21, 1979 – April 15, 2014) was an American musician best known for being the touring guitarist for the American metal group Korn, after the departure of Brian "Head" Welch in February 2005. He also played the lead guitar for the solo tour of Jonathan Davis from Korn.

He was hired on and joined forces in a project group called Mr Creepy. The band was formed by Arthur Gonzales who also brought in (studio musician) Michael G Clark, award-winning bassist/vocalist, Jasmine Cain, and ex-Black Label Society drummer, Mike Froedge.

His main band, stOrk, with Thomas Lang, singer VK Lynne and bassist Kelly Lemieux, is an experimental rock band that combined different elements, including thrash metal and progressive rock.

In 2010, he made some songs with an American metal band, Echoes The Fall.

He appeared in a 2014 episode of the TBS prank show, Deal with It. The episode aired on May 21.

Gibson died on April 15, 2014, in Birmingham, Alabama, of complications from a blood clotting disorder.

Personal life
Shane held a Bachelor's degree in Music Performance and Music Therapy from Berklee College of Music.

Discography
 2005: As a solo artist – Mr. Stork
 2007: Jonathan Davis and the SFA – Alone I Play
 2009: L. Shankar – Face to Face
 2009: Jason C. Miller – Last to Go Home
 2010: SchwarZenatoR – SchwarZenatoR
 2010: stOrk – stOrk
 2010: New World Man – A Tribute to Rush ("New World Man", "Fly By Night", "Force Ten")
 2010: Echoes the Fall – "Free"
 2011: Jonathan Davis and the SFA – Debut solo album
 2013: SchwarZenatoR - "Jingle All The Way" Single
 2014: Mr Creepy - "Mr Creepy EP"
 2014: stOrk – Broken Pieces

References

External links

Official stOrk website

1979 births
2014 deaths
American heavy metal guitarists
American rock guitarists
Berklee College of Music alumni
Choctawhatchee High School alumni
Deaths from blood disease
Eight-string guitarists
Jonathan Davis and the SFA members
Korn members
Moments in Grace members
Seven-string guitarists
StOrk members